Ray Kuhlman (September 10, 1900 – October 7, 1956) was a member of the Wisconsin State Assembly.

Biography
Kuhlman was born on September 10, 1900 in Eau Claire, Wisconsin. He was in the grocery business and served as Sheriff of Eau Claire County, Wisconsin from 1943 to 1948 and again from 1951 to 1954. Kuhlman died in a traffic collision on October 7, 1956.

Political career
Kuhlman served as sheriff of Eau Claire County from 1943 to 1946, and again from 1950 to 1955. Kuhlman was elected to the Assembly as a Republican in 1954. He remained a member until his death.

References

Politicians from Eau Claire, Wisconsin
Republican Party members of the Wisconsin State Assembly
Wisconsin sheriffs
Businesspeople from Wisconsin
1900 births
1956 deaths
Road incident deaths in Wisconsin
20th-century American businesspeople
20th-century American politicians